Desert Sands is a 1955 American adventure film directed by Lesley Selander and written by Danny Arnold, George W. George and George F. Slavin. The film stars Ralph Meeker, Marla English, J. Carrol Naish, John Carradine, Ron Randell, John Smith and Keith Larsen.

The film was released on November 18, 1955, by United Artists. The film was based on the 1954 novel Punitive Action, one of a series of French Foreign Legion novels written by John Robb. Unlike many Foreign Legion films the film was set in the 1950s.

Plot

A strong force of mounted tribal Arabs launches a surprise attack on a French Foreign Legion fort in the North African desert, having previously intercepted and brutally massacred a relief column en route to the fort.  After an Alamo-like battle, the more numerous Arabs capture the fort.  Addressing the surviving Legionnaires as captives, the Arab leader makes passing reference to Pan-Islam as a motivation for the attacks.

Various sub-plots ensue, until eventually another Legion relief column approaches the fort, unaware that it has been captured. The Arabs create the appearance that all is well and ambush the relief column as it enters the fort. Meanwhile, the captive Legionnaire survivors from the original garrison escape and join the fighting. Another all-out, Alamo-style shootout follows, but this time the reinforced Legionnaires are victorious. The French flag is raised over the fort once again as the captured Arab survivors are led away.

Production
The film was shot at the Imperial Dunes in California.  The first choice for the lead was Paul Newman who was offered $20,000 however his agent wanted $35,000 that the producers would not pay.

Cast
 Ralph Meeker as Captain David Malcolm
 Marla English as Princess Zara
 J. Carrol Naish as Sergeant Diepel
 John Carradine as Jala, The Wine Merchant
 Ron Randell as Private Peter Ambrose Havers
 John Smith as Private Rex Tyle
 Keith Larsen as El Zanal
Marc Cavell as Young Boy El Zanal
 Lita Milan as Alita
 Philip Tonge as Corporal Sandy McTosh
 Peter Mamakos as Private Lucia "Lucky" Capella
 Otto Waldis as Gabin
 Jarl Victor as Lieutenant Gina Mackie
 Mort Mills as Woloack
 Aaron Saxon as Tama
 Nico Minardos as Gerard
 Albert Carrier as Ducco
 Terence De Marney as Kramer
 Peter Bourne as Weems
 Peter Norman as Dr. Kleiner
 Joseph Waring as Dylak Spokesman
 Bela Kovacs as Major Henri Panton

References

External links 
 

1955 films
1950s English-language films
United Artists films
American adventure films
1955 adventure films
Films directed by Lesley Selander
Films about the French Foreign Legion
Films based on British novels
Films set in Africa
Films set in deserts
Films shot in California
Films scored by Paul Dunlap
1950s American films